Winston Creek is a river in Thunder Bay District, Ontario, Canada. The total length of the river is thus .

See also
List of rivers of Ontario

References

Rivers of Thunder Bay District